Rochdale is a town in Greater Manchester, England, at the foothills of the South Pennines in the dale on the River Roch,  northwest of Oldham and  northeast of Manchester. It is the administrative centre of the Metropolitan Borough of Rochdale, which had a population of 211,699 in the 2011 census.

Located within the historic boundaries of the county of Lancashire. Rochdale's recorded history begins with an entry in the Domesday Book of 1086 under
"Recedham Manor". The ancient parish of Rochdale was a division of the hundred of Salford and one of the largest ecclesiastical parishes in England, comprising several townships. By 1251, Rochdale had become important enough to have been granted a Royal charter. Rochdale flourished into a centre of northern England's woollen trade, and by the early 18th century was described as being "remarkable for many wealthy merchants".

Rochdale rose to prominence in the 19th century as a mill town and centre for textile manufacture during the Industrial Revolution. It was a boomtown of the Industrial Revolution, and amongst the first industrialised towns. The Rochdale Canal—one of the major navigable broad canals of the United Kingdom—was a highway of commerce during this time used for the haulage of cotton, wool and coal to and from the area. The socioeconomic change brought by the success of Rochdale's textile industry in the 19th century led to its rise to borough status and it remained a dominant settlement in its region. However, during the 20th century Rochdale's spinning capacity declined towards an eventual halt.

Rochdale is the birthplace of the modern Co-operative Movement, to which more than one billion people worldwide belonged in 2012. The Rochdale Equitable Pioneers Society was founded in 1844 by 28 local residents as a response to the high cost and frequent adulteration of basic foodstuffs by shopkeepers at the time. The Pioneers were notable for combining the notion of the patronage dividend alongside investing trading surplus for member benefit, especially in education. The Rochdale Principles, the set of ideals which underpinned the society, are still used, in updated form, by the International Co-operative Alliance. The Rochdale Pioneers shop was the precursor to The Co-operative Group, the largest consumer co-operative in the world.

Rochdale Town Hall—a Grade I listed building—dates from 1871 and is one of the United Kingdom's finest examples of Victorian Gothic revival architecture.

History

Etymology
The town is recorded as Recedham in the Domesday Book and Rachetham in 1193. Variations of Rechedham continue into the thirteenth century when the first element's termination is dropped as Rachedam became Racheham. This change was soon followed with the suffix -ham (homestead) changing to -dale (wide valley). Rachdale is recorded as a name for the town in 1242, but may have been used earlier as a name for the valley, Hundred and Parish. The Doomsday Book's rendering of the name led Eilert Ekwall to suggest a derivation from reced, an obscure Old English element meaning "hall". This etymology is described as "highly problematic" and not accepted, as the word reced is only used in poetic contexts and the etymology would be unique in Anglo Saxon England. This etymology would also require the name of the River Roch to be a back-formation from the name of the town, with more robust etymologies all stating that the Anglo-Saxon settlement borrowed a pre-existing Brittonic name for the river.

The early forms of Rachet-ham and Reched-ham may record a compound ro-ced or ro-cet. The first element is either from the common intensive prefix rö- (Modern Welsh rhy-, Cornish re-) meaning  "great" and found in other river names such as the Ribble and the Rother or rag-, (Modern Welsh ar-) meaning "opposite" or "adjacent to". The second element would then almost certainly be cę:d or cet, (Modern Welsh coed) meaning "wood". This would give the town's name a meaning of "Homestead on the river of the great wood" or "Homestead on the river opposite the wood".

Another etymology focused on the early forms similarities to Rheged, the Cumbric-speaking kingdom in North West England during the Middle Ages. Although this etymology is used to support the theory that this part of Lancashire may have been the centre of a separate kingdom known in Medieval Welsh literature as "South Rheged" or "Argoed" (opposite the wood), it remains unproven as the kingdom's boundaries have not been identified. A further suggestion is that the name "rheged" simply means "area" in the Cumbric language (related to Regio in Latin and Region in Modern English) and that the kingdom of Rheged and the river Roch merely shared a common Celtic name.

Although the name of the river is still pronounced  (with a long vowel sound), Rochdale is pronounced  (with a shorter o sound).

Early history

A Roman road, leading from Mamucium (Manchester) to Eboracum (York), crossed the moors at Blackstone Edge.

During the time of the Danelaw, Rochdale was subjected to incursions by the Danes on the Saxons. The castle that Castleton is named after, and of which no trace remains, was one of twelve Saxon forts possibly destroyed in frequent conflicts that occurred between the Saxons and Danes during the 10th and 11th centuries.

At the time of the Norman Conquest the manor was held by a Saxon thegn, Gamel. Rochdale appears in the Domesday Book of 1086 as Recedham and was described as laying within the hundred of Salford and the county of Cheshire.  At that time, Rochdale was under the lordship of Roger the Poitevin.  Before 1212 Henry II granted the manor to Roger de Lacy whose family retained it as part of the Honour of Clitheroe until it passed to the Dukes of Lancaster by marriage and then by 1399 to the Crown. John Byron bought the manor in 1638 and it was sold by the poet, Lord Byron, in 1823, to the Deardens, who hold the title. Rochdale had no manor house but the "Orchard" built in 1702 and acquired in 1745 by Simon Dearden was the home of the lords of the manor after 1823. It was described as "a red-brick building of no architectural distinction, on the north side of the river opposite the town hall" and sometimes referred to as the Manor House. It was demolished in 1922.

In medieval times, Rochdale was a market town, and weekly markets were held from 1250 when Edmund de Lacy obtained a grant for a market and an annual fair. The market was held outside the parish church where there was an "Orator's Corner".

Industrial Revolution
The manufacture of woollen cloth, particularly baize, kerseys and flannels, was important from the reign of Henry VIII. At this time the industry was rooted in the domestic system but towards the end of the 18th century mills powered by water were built. Water power was replaced by steam power in the 19th century and coal mines, mostly drift mines, were opened where coal from the lower coal measures outcropped around the town. The Deardens who were lords of the manor were among the local coal owners. By the mid-1800s the woollen trade was declining and the cotton trade which took advantage of technological developments in spinning and weaving growing in importance. Rochdale became one of the world's most productive cotton spinning towns when rose to prominence during the 19th century as a major mill town and centre for textile manufacture during the Industrial Revolution. It was a boomtown of the Industrial Revolution, and amongst the first ever industrialised towns. By the end of the 19th century there were woollen mills, silk manufacturers, bleachers and dyers but cotton spinning and weaving were the dominant industries in Rochdale. The socioeconomic change brought by the success of Rochdale's textile industry in the 19th century led to its rise to borough status and it remained a dominant settlement in its region. However, during the 20th century Rochdale's spinning capacity declined towards an eventual halt.

The Rochdale Pioneers opened the first Cooperative shop in Toad Lane in 1844. The reformer and Member of Parliament, John Bright (1811–1889), was born in Rochdale and gained a reputation as a leader of political dissent and supporter of the Anti-Corn Law League. The Baron Street drill hall opened in around 1865.

Post-industrial
The first seven series of the BBC school drama Waterloo Road were set in Rochdale between 2006 and 2012, and filmed on location at the former Hilltop Primary School in Kirkholt, which closed on 31 August 2005. Most of the out-of-school scenes in the series were filmed around Rochdale, and many of the pupils' homes seen on television were council houses in the Kirkholt area which were mostly built in the early postwar years.

It was announced by the BBC and Shed Media that filming on the series in Rochdale was to end in late 2011, with production moving to Scotland from early 2012. The final scenes to be shot at the Hilltop Primary site were filmed in November 2011. In April 2012, filming on the eighth series began on location at the new Waterloo Road set, the former Greenock Academy in Greenock, Scotland.

The Rochdale child sex abuse ring consisted of the organised child sexual abuse that occurred from 2003 until 2009 and the failure of local authorities to act on reports of the abuse until 2014.

Attempts by Rochdale Crisis Intervention Team co-ordinator for the NHS, Sara Rowbotham to alert police and authorities to "patterns of sexual abuse" were ignored. Between 2003 and 2014, Sara Rowbothan, made more than 180 attempts to alert police and social services but was told the witnesses were not reliable.

In the 2019 Multiple deprivation index, an area of central Rochdale was ranked as the most deprived area in Greater Manchester and the 31st most deprived area in England.

Governance

Lying within the historic county boundaries of Lancashire since the early 12th century, Rochdale was recorded in 1066 as held by Gamel, one of the twenty-one thegns of the Hundred of Salfordshire.

The ancient ecclesiastical parish of Rochdale was divided into four townships: Butterworth, Castleton, Hundersfield and Spotland. Hundersfield was later divided into four townships: Blatchinworth, Calderbrook, Wardleworth and Wuerdle and Wardle.

In 1825 commissioners for the social and economic improvement of the town were established. The town became part of a parliamentary borough in 1832. As there were no existing township boundaries, the commissioners and later the parliamentary constituency were deemed to cover a circular area extending three-quarters of a mile from the old market-place. Under the terms of the Poor Law Amendment Act 1834 Rochdale became the head of Rochdale Poor Law Union which was established on 15 February 1837 despite considerable local opposition. In 1856 Rochdale was incorporated as a municipal borough, giving it borough status in the United Kingdom and after 1858 it obtained the powers of the improvement commissioners. In 1872 the remaining area of Wardleworth township and parts of Castleton, Wuerdle and Wardle, Spotland and Butterworth townships were added to the borough.

When the administrative county of Lancashire was created by the Local Government Act 1888, Rochdale was elevated to become the County Borough of Rochdale and was, in modern terms, a unitary authority area exempt from the administration of Lancashire County Council. In 1900 most of Castleton Urban District was added to the borough; this urban district included parts of Castleton, Hopwood and Thornham townships. In 1933 parts of Norden Urban District and Birtle with Bamford civil parish were added to the borough. Under the Local Government Act 1972, the town's autonomous county borough status was abolished. The municipal boroughs of Middleton and Heywood and Littleborough, Milnrow and Wardle urban districts are now part of the Metropolitan Borough of Rochdale, one of the ten metropolitan boroughs in Greater Manchester.

Since 1953, Rochdale has been twinned with Bielefeld in Germany and since 1956 with Tourcoing in France, as well as Sahiwal in Pakistan since 1988 and Lviv in Ukraine since 1992. Sahiwal council has received many gifts like fire brigade trucks, ambulances and grants for hospitals from the people of Rochdale.

Parliamentary representation
The Rochdale constituency was created by the Reform Act of 1832. The constituency was held for two decades during the 20th century by Cyril Smith, first of the Liberal Party and then of the Liberal Democrats. Following the 2010 General Election, the town was represented by Simon Danczuk MP, who was elected as a Labour MP but was  subsequently suspended and under investigation by the Labour Party.  Tony Lloyd is the current MP for Rochdale constituency following the snap general election held on 8 June 2017.

Geography

Blackstone Edge, Saddleworth Moor and the South Pennines are close to the east, whilst on all other sides, Rochdale is bound by smaller towns, including Whitworth, Littleborough, Milnrow, Royton, Heywood and Shaw and Crompton, with little or no green space between them.

Rochdale's built environment consists of a mixture of infrastructure, housing types and commercial buildings from a number of periods. Rochdale's housing stock is mixed, but has a significant amount of stone or red-brick terraced houses from the late 19th and early 20th centuries. Rochdale's Town Hall, seven large tower blocks (locally nicknamed 'The Seven Sisters') and a number of former cotton mills mark the town's skyline. The urban structure of Rochdale is regular when compared to most towns in England, its form restricted in places by its hilly upland terrain. Much of Rochdale's built environment is centred around a central business district in the town centre, which is the local centre of commerce.

There is a mixture of high-density urban areas, suburbs, semi-rural and rural locations in Rochdale, but overwhelmingly the land use in the town is urban. For purposes of the Office for National Statistics, it forms the fifth largest settlement of the Greater Manchester Urban Area, the United Kingdom's third largest conurbation. The M62 motorway passes to the south and southwest of Rochdale. Two heavy rail lines enter Rochdale from the east, joining at Rochdale railway station before continuing southwards to the city of Manchester.

Divisions and suburbs

 Ashworth
 Balderstone
 Bamford
 Belfield
 Buckley
 Buersil
 Burnedge
 Caldershaw
 Castleton
 Cronkeyshaw
 Cutgate
 Deeplish
 Falinge
 Fieldhouse
 Firgrove
 Foxholes
 Halfacre
 Hamer
 Healey
 Hurstead
 Kingsway
 Kirkholt
 Lowerfold
 Lowerplace
 Marland
 Meanwood
 Newbold
 Nook Farm
 Norden
 Oakenrod
 Oulder Hill
 Passmonds
 Prickshaw
 Rooley Moor
 Shawclough
 Smallbridge
 Smithy Bridge
 Sparth Bottom
 Spotland
 Sudden
 Syke
 Thornham
 Turf Hill
 Wardleworth

Climate
Rochdale experiences a temperate maritime climate, like much of the British Isles, with relatively cool summers and mild winters. There is regular but generally light precipitation throughout the year.

Demography

At the 2001 UK census, Rochdale had a population of 95,796. Of those over 16 years old, 28.2% were single (never married), 44.0% married, and 8.8% divorced. Rochdale's 37,730 households included 30.4% one-person, 36.6% married couples living together, 8.4% were co-habiting couples, and 11.1% single parents with their children. Of those aged 16–74, 37.1% had no academic qualifications, similar to the figure for all of Rochdale, but higher than that of 28.9% in all of England. Rochdale has the highest number of Jobseeker's Allowance claimants in Greater Manchester, with 6.1 per cent of its adult population claiming the benefit in early 2010.

In 2011, Rochdale had a population of 107,926 which makes it about the same size as Salford and Stockport. The population increased from 95,796 in 2001. Rochdale is one of four townships in the Metropolitan Borough of Rochdale along with Middleton, Heywood and Pennine (a township which includes Littleborough and Wardle). Rochdale is considered an Urban Subdivision by the local borough council.

In 2011, 34.8% of Rochdale's population were non white British, compared with 21.4% for the surrounding borough. Rochdale town also has almost double the percentage of Asians compared with the Metropolitan Borough of Rochdale, which had a population of 211,699 in 2011. This means the town takes up almost 55% of the borough's population.

Landmarks

Rochdale Town Hall is a Victorian era town hall "widely recognised as being one of the finest municipal buildings in the country". The Grade I listed building is the ceremonial headquarters of Rochdale Metropolitan Borough Council and houses local government departments, including the borough's civil registration office. Built in the Gothic Revival style it was inaugurated on 27 September 1871. The architect, William Henry Crossland, won a competition held in 1864. The town hall had a  clock tower topped by a wooden spire with a gilded statue of Saint George and the Dragon which were destroyed by fire on 10 April 1883. A new  stone clock tower and spire in the style of Manchester Town Hall was designed by Alfred Waterhouse, and erected in 1888. Art critic Nikolaus Pevsner described the building as possessing a "rare picturesque beauty". Its stained glass windows, some designed by William Morris, are credited as "the finest modern examples of their kind". The building came to the attention of Adolf Hitler who was said to have admired it so much that he wished to ship the building, brick-by-brick, to Nazi Germany had the United Kingdom been defeated in the Second World War.

Rochdale Cenotaph, a war memorial bearing four sculpted and painted flags, is opposite the town hall. It commemorates those who died in conflicts since the First World War (1914–1918). The monument and surrounding gardens were designed by Sir Edwin Lutyens.

Another vast feature in Rochdale is the Kingsway Business Park for which planning permission for its construction began in 2009. It covers an area of 420 acres (0.67 sq miles or 1.7 sq km). One of the most well known landmarks within the business park is the JD Sports Warehouse Distribution Centre, which was opened in 2012 and contains a facility of 1.4 million sq ft that employs over 1,000 people.

Transport
Public transport in Rochdale is co-ordinated by Transport for Greater Manchester who owns the bus station and coordinates transport services in the area.

Road
The earliest routes around Rochdale were tracks and packhorse routes and a paved track over Blackstone Edge into Yorkshire that had Roman origins. As trade increased the Blackstone Edge turnpike road was built in 1735.

The M62 motorway to the south of the town is accessed via the A627(M), which starts at Sandbrook Park in Rochdale and runs to Elk Mill in Chadderton. The A627(M) provides drivers a quick access to the M62 and to Oldham.

Rochdale Canal
The idea for the Rochdale Canal emerged in 1776, when James Brindley was commissioned to survey possible routes between Sowerby Bridge and Manchester. However it was not until 4 April 1794 that an Act of Parliament was obtained. The broad canal which linked the Bridgewater Canal in Manchester with the Aire and Calder Navigation at Sowerby Bridge became a major artery of commerce between Lancashire and Yorkshire for cotton, wool, coal, limestone, timber, and salt. The canal is fed from Hollingworth Lake. The canal fell into disuse but was restored and re-opened in 2003 after years of neglect, including its division by a motorway.

Rail and Metrolink

Demand from the cross-Pennine trade to support local cotton, wool and silk industries led to the building of the Manchester and Leeds Railway which opened in 1839 from Manchester to Littleborough, and from Normanton to Hebden Bridge in 1840. The linking section opened on completion of the Summit Tunnel in 1841. Rochdale railway station is about a mile south of the town centre. Trains run to Manchester Victoria, Halifax, Dewsbury, Bradford and Leeds. A new service to Burnley and Accrington commenced in 2015.

The service to Manchester Victoria on the Oldham Loop line ended in October 2009, in preparation for conversion of the line to an extension of the Metrolink light rail system, renamed as the Oldham and Rochdale Line. It was deferred in 2004 on grounds of cost but in July 2006 plans were approved for the extension from Manchester Victoria as far as Rochdale railway station, and opened on 28 February 2013. The extension to Rochdale town centre, via Drake Street and terminating opposite Rochdale Interchange opened on 31 March 2014.

Bus
Until 1969, the borough's bus service was provided by the municipal operator Rochdale Corporation Transport which was merged into the SELNEC Passenger Transport Executive. Rochdale's old bus station closed in November 2013 and was demolished in April 2014 along with the multi-storey car park and municipal offices (known locally as 'The Black Box'), to make way for the new Town Centre East retail and leisure development. The replacement Rochdale Interchange is located next to the council office building Number One Riverside and is linked with Rochdale Town Centre tram stop.

There are frequent bus services from Rochdale, operated by First Greater Manchester, to Middleton, Royton, Chadderton, Oldham, Ashton-under-Lyne, Bury and Bolton. Frequent services to Manchester city centre are provided by First Greater Manchester's 17 overground service. There are cross-county services into Lancashire and West Yorkshire, provided by Rosso, who operates to Rawtenstall and Accrington, First West Yorkshire, which operates to Burnley and Halifax, both via Todmorden, while the service to Halifax via Ripponden is operated by Yorkshire Tiger.

Education

Hopwood Hall College is a further education college with a campus in Rochdale. It offers vocational courses for school leavers, and courses for adult learners and some higher education.

Rochdale Sixth Form College opened in September 2010, and is the primary provider of A-Level courses in Rochdale and the wider Metropolitan Borough. Most secondary schools in the area do not offer sixth form courses to students any more.

Religion

St Chad's Church is a grade II* listed building. It was the mother church of ancient parish of Rochdale and was founded before 1170, possibly on an Anglo-Saxon site. Much of the current building is the result of late Victorian restoration. A local legend relates that the site was chosen by spirits and fairies as on several occasions stone for the church building was moved from near the river to the hill on which St. Chad's stands. The church is accessed from the town below by a flight of 124 steps. The town stocks (no longer in use) are in the churchyard.

St Chad's Church is a medieval foundation; however this is not apparent from its outside aspect. The arcades (13th century) have some round and some octagonal piers and variations in ornamentation while the tower arch is of the 14th century. In the 1850s there was a restoration by Joseph Clarke; a rebuilding and lengthening of the chancel which included arcades with narrow bays was the work of J. S. Crowther in 1883-85. In the 1850s the north aisle was rebuilt; in the 1870s the south aisle was rebuilt and the height of the tower increased by the addition of a large and ornate bell-stage. In the Dearden chapel is a monument to John Dearden, rector in the 14th century; in this chapel are also a number of brasses to members of the Dearden family which are however forgeries made for James Dearden c. 1847. The monument to Jacob Dearden (died 1825) is by R. W. Sievier. The most notable monument is the signed work of William Coleburne of London; it commemorates James Holte of Castleton (d. 1712) and Dorothea his wife (d. 1718) and is made of grey and white marble,<ref>Fleetwood-Hesketh, Peter (1955) Murray's Lancashire Architectural Guide. London: John Murray; p. 169; it is described here as one of the finest in Lancashire and one of the few of Coleburne's works to be signed</ref> 

St John the Baptist Catholic Church was built in 1927 in Byzantine Revival style and is a Grade II* listed building.

Marland Grange was a Cistercian grange of Stanlow, Cheshire, then of Whalley. The grange was founded before 1212.

Rochdale is also home to 21 mosques of various denominations. Rochdale Central Masjid [Idara] is the largest of Rochdale's mosques.

Public services

Home Office policing in Rochdale is provided by Greater Manchester Police and the Rochdale Division has headquarters at Town Meadow adjacent to the magistrates' court. Statutory emergency fire and rescue service is provided by the Greater Manchester Fire and Rescue Service, which has fire stations in Rochdale, Littleborough and Heywood.

Emergency healthcare is provided by Pennine Acute Hospitals NHS Trust. The Trust operates four hospitals in the North Manchester area, including the Rochdale Infirmary for the NHS. Patient transport is provided by the North West Ambulance Service. Rochdale Infirmary is the only hospital serving the town since the closure of Birch Hill Hospital which occupied the former Rochdale Union Workhouse at Dearnley in 2007. New facilities were established at Rochdale Infirmary as part of the town's healthcare restructure. Primary care services in Rochdale are provided by the Heywood, Middleton and Rochdale NHS Primary Care Trust. In 2006 it was announced that Accident & Emergency facilities at Rochdale Infirmary would be removed by 2011, leaving Oldham and Bury as the closest departments serving Rochdale. Confirmation that the unit would close was met with protest locally, including a march through the town centre.

Waste management is co-ordinated by the local authority via the Greater Manchester Waste Disposal Authority.

Rochdale's distribution network operator for electricity was United Utilities until 2010, when its electricity subsidiary was sold to Electricity North West. There are no power stations in the town, but Scout Moor Wind Farm which has 26 turbines was built on the high moors between Rawtenstall and Rochdale. The wind farm generates 65MW of electricity. United Utilities manage Rochdale's drinking and waste water. Water supplies are sourced from several reservoirs, including Watergrove, Blackstone Edge, Greenbooth and Piethorne in Rochdale's outlying moorland.

Sport
Rochdale has two professional sports teams: Rochdale A.F.C. (football) and Rochdale Hornets (rugby league); both play home games at the Spotland Stadium. Rochdale AFC were founded in 1907 and joined the Football League in 1921, when the new Football League Third Division (North) was created. The club has never played above the third tier of the English league divisional structure and, before its promotion at the end of the 2009/10 season (their first promotion since 1969), had played continuously in the Football League's lowest division since 1974. However, the club reached the Football League Cup Final in 1962 and lost to Norwich City.
Rochdale Hornets is one of the original twenty-two rugby clubs that formed the Northern Rugby Football Union in 1895, making it one of the world's first rugby league teams.

The town was previously home to defunct non-league football club, Rochdale Town, but still hosts National Conference League amateur rugby league club Rochdale Mayfield. Rochdale R.U.F.C. who play in Bamford. There are two adult amateur football leagues: the Rochdale Online Alliance League and the Rochdale and District Sunday Football League.

Golf courses around the town include Rochdale Golf Club and Marland Golf Course, at Springfield Park. The town also has a number of cricket clubs, most of which play in the Pennine Cricket League (PCL). Rochdale Sub-Aqua Club was formed in 1959 and remains active.

Speedway racing was staged at the Athletic Grounds in 1928–30 and returned at the start of the 1970s when it provided a home for the British League Division Two Belle Vue Aces juniors and Rochdale Hornets. Peter Collins, who won the 1976 World Championship was a Hornets rider.
Stuart Smith and Doug Cronshaw  competed in BriSCA Formula 1 Stock Cars between 1965 and 1984.

 International relations 

 Twin towns - sister cities 

  Barisal, Barisal Division, Bangladesh
  Bielefeld, North Rhine-Westphalia, Germany
  Lviv, Lviv Oblast, Ukraine
  Sahiwal, Punjab, Pakistan
  Tourcoing, Nord, Hauts-de-France, France

Notable people 

The 19th century saw several notable characters. Lancashire dialect poet Edwin Waugh (1817–1890) was born and brought up in the town, as was Roger Fenton, noted as one of the first war photographers. The aristocrat and poet George Gordon Byron was Lord Byron of Rochdale. Rochdale has a proud liberal political heritage, as shown by such people as John Bright, one of the first Quakers to sit in the House of Commons; Samuel Bamford, the radical and writer; and Rev. Joseph Cooke, the inspiration behind the Methodist Unitarian movement. In the 20th century, another prominent (if now controversial) political personality was Cyril Smith.

Among Rochdale's residents have been several musicians, including singers piri, Gracie Fields, Lisa Stansfield (born in Heywood) and Barb Jungr and bands Kaliphz also known as Kaleef, Autechre, Tractor, The Way We Live, the Chameleons, the Mock Turtles and the Cassandra Complex. Good Charlotte drummer Dean Butterworth also hails from Rochdale. Broadcasters John Peel, Mark Chapman, Liz and Andy Kershaw also have links with the town, Peel having lived there for a period of time and the latter three having been born there. Actors Anna Friel and Bill Oddie were born in Rochdale. Don Estelle, who was born and brought up in Crumpsall, lived for much of his life in Rochdale and was buried there in August 2003.

Sajid Javid, the former Chancellor of the Exchequer was born in Rochdale to British Pakistani parents.

Dr Fayyaz Afzal OBE. Lived in Rochdale, attended Heybrook Primary School, Wardle High School and then Hopwood Hall College. To go onto university and then follow his legal career as Barrister and now sitting as a Circuit Judge. 
Dr Afzal is blind and became the first Asian practicing Barrister and now District Judge. 
For voluntary services to the disabled in the legal profession he was awarded an OBE in 2007, followed by a CBE in 2021 and an Honorary Doctorate from Staffordshire University. Dr Fayyaz Afzal also became the first blind District Judge in the UK and was sworn in on 17 February 2017.

Other notable residents include businessman and philanthropist Sir Peter Ogden, Businessman and Author Benjamin Howarth, novelist Nicholas Blincoe, Monica Coghlan, a prostitute caught up in the Jeffrey Archer scandal, and the banker Rev. Paul Flowers. Poet John Siddique was brought up in Rochdale and has referred to the town in several poems. Novelist Anna Jacobs was born in Rochdale. World Series of poker winner Jake Cody grew up in Rochdale. Elite British climber Ben Thornton was brought up in Rochdale. The footballer Earl Barrett was born there in April 1967 to Jamaican immigrant parents. Great Britain Olympian Craig Dawson, represented hometown club Rochdale and Bolton Wanderers at football.

See also

Listed buildings in Rochdale
Rochdale power station

References

Notes

Bibliography
 
Roethe, Johanna and Williams, Mike (2019), Central Rochdale, Greater Manchester: Historic area assessment'' (Historic England Research Report Series no. 56–2019, available online)

External links

 www.rochdale.gov.uk Rochdale Metropolitan Borough Council website.
 www.pennineland.co.uk Development Arm of Rochdale Development Agency (RDA) Uniting Private & Public Sector to support the Regeneration of Rochdale Borough
 www.statsandmaps.co.uk Stats and Maps is the Rochdale Borough statistics and maps website. It is a shared evidence based that provides quick and easy on-line access to data, information, and intelligence about the borough of Rochdale, and aims to meet the needs of the local community, LSP partners, and the general public

 
Towns in Greater Manchester
Unparished areas in Greater Manchester
Geography of the Metropolitan Borough of Rochdale